Gubenko or Hubenko (Russian or Ukrainian: Губенко) is a gender-neutral Slavic surname that may refer to 
Nikita Gubenko (born 1994), Russian slalom canoeist
Nikolai Gubenko (1941–2020), Soviet actor, film and theatre director
Julius Gubenko (born 1924), professionally known as Terry Gibbs, American jazz musician
Valeriy Hubenko (1939–2000), head of the State Border Guard Service of Ukraine

See also
 
 

Ukrainian-language surnames